The Tuamotu reed warbler (Acrocephalus atyphus) is a species of Old World warbler in the family Acrocephalidae.
It is found only in French Polynesia.

Taxonomy
Acrocephalus atyphus includes the following subspecies:
 A. t. atyphus - (Wetmore, 1919)
 A. t. eremus - (Wetmore, 1919)
 A. t. niauensis - (Murphy & Mathews, 1929)
 A. t. palmarum - (Murphy & Mathews, 1929)
 A. t. ravus - (Wetmore, 1919)
 A. t. flavidus - (Murphy & Mathews, 1929)

References 

Tuamotu reed warbler
Birds of the Tuamotus
Tuamotu reed warbler
Taxa named by Alexander Wetmore
Taxonomy articles created by Polbot
Endemic birds of French Polynesia